The Foreign Extraterritorial Measures Act is a statute of Canada. The Act was enacted by the Canadian Parliament in 1984 and became effective February 14, 1985, in an attempt to block the extraterritorial application of United States anti-Cuba laws to Canadian corporations. The term Canadian corporation includes Canadian subsidiaries and branches of U.S. companies.

Intent
The general intent of the Act was to preclude the implementation of US law, as it relates to restrictions on trade with Cuba, to businesses in Canada.  After passage of the US Act, The Cuban Liberty and Democratic Solidarity (Libertad) Act of 1996 (Helms–Burton Act, Pub.L. 104–114, 110 Stat. 
785, 22 U.S.C. §§ 6021–6091) further changes to the Act were approved effective January 1, 1997.

Orders
Orders implementing this Act include:
 The Foreign Extraterritorial Measures (United States) Order (1990) dated October 31, 1990 (SOR/90-751)
 The Foreign Extraterritorial Measures (United States) Order (1992) (SOR/92-584)
 The Foreign Extraterritorial Measures (United States) Order (1996) (SOR/96-84)

References

External links
 

1984 in Canadian law
Canadian federal legislation
Canada–Cuba relations